The eighth season of Mira quién baila, also known as Mira quién baila All Stars premiered on Univision on January 12, 2020. The TV series is the American Spanish-language version of British version Strictly Come Dancing and American version Dancing with the Stars. Eight celebrities are paired with eight professional ballroom dancers. The winner will receive a grand prize donation to the charity of their choice. Javier Poza and Chiquinquirá Delgado returned as the show's hosts. Dayanara Torres and Casper Smart returned as judges. Bianca Marroquín returned as judge, after being absent for the previous two seasons; while Yuri did not return as judge. The winner, Kiara Liz, received $25,000 for her chosen charity.

Celebrities

Ratings

References

Dancing with the Stars
2020 American television seasons